The Cornell School was a one-room schoolhouse in Alexandria, Ohio. It was built in 1886 and was in operation until 1923, when it was merged into a larger public school district.

External links 
 One-room Schoolhouse Center - Cornell School

Defunct schools in Ohio